Saif Faiz Badruddin Tyabji (1904–1957) was a solicitor, mathematician, an educationist passionately devoted to the cause of female education, and a nationalist committed to the idea of India.  He was closely associated with the Anjuman-i Islam of Bombay from the 1930s till his death in November 1957.  He was a Congress Member of Parliament in 1957 from Jalna in Maharashtra.

Education & work
Tyabji was grandson of an early president of India's Congress party, Badruddin Tyabji (1844–1906). Though he was an engineer educated at Cambridge, his career as a lawyer and a judge were perhaps surpassed by his role as a Member of Parliament representing the Congress party in newly independent India. He was in the forefront of reform of his own community. He realised the lack of English education amongst the Muslims had hurt them.  He resolutely opposed the purdah system for Muslim women as it prevented their education and social advancement.

In 1955 Tyabji wrote a series of essays in the influential Urdu newspaper Inquilab, which later were translated to English and published under the title, The Future of Muslims in India. He felt that Muslims should do a lot more than vote for India's dominant party - they should join it and influence its policies. Like other kinds of Indians, he felt Muslims had to "take an active part in the formation of a new Indian Culture". However, he noted "if Muslims sit back with folded arms, we can rest assured that the new Indian Culture will have little to do with the achievements of this country". Tyabji's other suggestions were that Muslims ask for technical and commercial education, rather than merely study the humanities and join the ranks of the educated unemployed.

Death
His early death on 12 November 1957 was described by his cousin, the distinguished conservationist Zafar Futehally as, "a great tragedy for the Muslims of India".

References

1957 deaths
1904 births
Lok Sabha members from Maharashtra
India MPs 1957–1962
People from Marathwada
People from Jalna district
Marathi politicians
Indian people of Arab descent

Tyabji family
Indian National Congress politicians from Maharashtra